The 1893 Massachusetts gubernatorial election was held on November 7, 1893. Incumbent Democratic Governor William Russell did not run for a fourth term in office. Republican U.S. Representative Frederic Greenhalge was elected to succeed him, defeating Democratic former U.S. Representative John E. Russell.

General election

Results

See also
 1893 Massachusetts legislature

References

Governor
1893
Massachusetts
November 1893 events